The Zhizdra is a river in Kaluga Oblast in Russia, Oka's left tributary. The Zhizdra freezes up in late November and stays icebound until early April. Its main tributaries are the Resseta, Vytebet, and Seryona. The towns of Kozelsk and Zhizdra are located on the shores of the Zhizdra. The name is of Lithuanian origin. In Lithuanian, žizdras means 'thick sand, gravel'.

The lower course of the Zhizdra is located in Ugra National Park.

References

Rivers of Kaluga Oblast